The 1931 Nevada Wolf Pack football team was an American football team that represented the University of Nevada in the Far Western Conference (FWC) during the 1931 college football season. In their third season under head coach George Philbrook, the team compiled a 2–5–2 record (2–1–1 against conference opponents), were outscored by opponents by a total of 134 to 76.

Schedule

References

Nevada
Nevada Wolf Pack football seasons
Nevada Wolf Pack football